USS LST-562 was a United States Navy  in commission from 1944 to 1946.

Construction and commissioning
LST-562 was laid down on 28 February 1944 at Evansville, Indiana, by the Missouri Valley Bridge and Iron Company. She was launched on 28 April 1944, sponsored by Mrs. D. A. Nordeen, and commissioned on 18 May 1944.

Service history
During World War II, LST-562 was assigned to the Pacific Theater of Operations, where was a unit of LST Division 43 under LST Group 22 (commanded by Commander E. H. Pope, USN), which was a component of LST Flotilla Eight (commanded by Captain E. Watts, USN). She took part in the landings on Morotai in September 1944 and in the Tarakan Island operation in April and May 1945. During the ships time in commission, the first Captain was succeeded as her commanding officer by Lieutenant F. P. Lawrence, USNR.
Note: Lt. Richard N. Shaw, USNR, was the first Captain of LST 652; not LST 562.

Following the war, "LST 562" performed occupation duty in the Far East until mid-December 1945, when she departed for the United States.

Decommissioning and disposal
After returning to the United States, LST-562 was decommissioned on 21 May 1946 and stricken from the Navy List on 3 July 1946. On 19 April 1948, she was sold to the Bethlehem Steel Company of Bethlehem, Pennsylvania, for scrapping.

Honors and awards
LST-562 earned two battle stars for her World War II service.

References

NavSource Online: Amphibious Photo Archive LST-562

 

LST-542-class tank landing ships
World War II amphibious warfare vessels of the United States
Ships built in Evansville, Indiana
1944 ships